Sandra Dahlmann (born 3 June 1968) is a German former swimmer. She competed in two events at the 1984 Summer Olympics representing West Germany.

References

External links
 

1968 births
Living people
German female swimmers
Olympic swimmers of West Germany
Swimmers at the 1984 Summer Olympics
People from Gladbeck
Sportspeople from Münster (region)